Tangvall is a village in Kristiansand municipality in Agder county, Norway. It was the administrative centre of the old Søgne municipality which existed until 2020. The village is located along the European route E39 highway and the river Søgneelva.  The village sits just north of Åros and Høllen, northeast of the village of Eig, and east of the village of Lunde.

Together, Tangvall, Lunde, Høllen, Eig, Åros, and Langenes all form one large urban area known as Søgne.

The Old Søgne Church is located in the southeastern part of the urban area, just north of Åros and Langenes. The "new" Søgne Church is located in Lunde. The municipal government is based in Tangvall since 1974. Prior to that time, it was located in Lunde. The municipal high school is also located here.

References

Villages in Agder
Geography of Kristiansand